Elfriede Cohnen (born 1901, died 1979) was a German lawyer and medical doctor. Like many intellectuals, she supported the political aid organization Rote Hilfe Deutschlands, which had set itself the task of providing legal assistance to needy prosecutors without regard to the person.

References

1901 births
1979 deaths
20th-century German lawyers